Maraca is a musical instrument.

Maraca may also refer to:

Places
Maracas Valley in Trinidad and Tobago
Maracas Beach
Maracas–Saint Joseph
Maracá Ecological Station in Brazil
Maracá-Jipioca Ecological Station in Brazil
Maracá River, a river in Amapá, Brazil

Other
Maraca, an obsolete name for Bumba, a genus of tarantulas
Maraca (cockroach), Neotropical cockroach in the family Anaplectidae
 Maricón, a gay man or in Spanish profanity
"Maraca" (song), a 2011 song by Swedish artist Mohombi
Maraca pie